Events from the year 2002 in Canada.

Incumbents

Estimated Canadian population: 31,413,990

Crown 
 Monarch – Elizabeth II

Federal government 
 Governor General – Adrienne Clarkson 
 Prime Minister – Jean Chrétien
 Chief Justice – Beverley McLachlin (British Columbia)
 Parliament – 37th

Provincial governments

Lieutenant governors 
Lieutenant Governor of Alberta – Lois Hole 
Lieutenant Governor of British Columbia – Iona Campagnolo 
Lieutenant Governor of Manitoba – Peter Liba 
Lieutenant Governor of New Brunswick – Marilyn Trenholme Counsell 
Lieutenant Governor of Newfoundland and Labrador – Arthur Maxwell House (until November 1) then Edward Roberts
Lieutenant Governor of Nova Scotia – Myra Freeman 
Lieutenant Governor of Ontario – Hillary Weston (until March 7) then James Bartleman
Lieutenant Governor of Prince Edward Island – Léonce Bernard 
Lieutenant Governor of Quebec – Lise Thibault 
Lieutenant Governor of Saskatchewan – Lynda Haverstock

Premiers 
Premier of Alberta – Ralph Klein 
Premier of British Columbia – Gordon Campbell
Premier of Manitoba – Gary Doer 
Premier of New Brunswick – Bernard Lord 
Premier of Newfoundland and Labrador – Roger Grimes 
Premier of Nova Scotia – John Hamm
Premier of Ontario – Mike Harris (until April 15) then Ernie Eves
Premier of Prince Edward Island – Pat Binns 
Premier of Quebec – Bernard Landry 
Premier of Saskatchewan – Lorne Calvert

Territorial governments

Commissioners 
 Commissioner of Yukon – Jack Cable 
 Commissioner of Northwest Territories – Glenna Hansen 
 Commissioner of Nunavut – Peter Irniq

Premiers 
Premier of the Northwest Territories – Stephen Kakfwi
Premier of Nunavut – Paul Okalik 
Premier of Yukon – Pat Duncan (until November 30) then Dennis Fentie

Events

January to March
January 11 – Ford Motor Co. announces the closing of the truck assembly plant in Oakville, Ontario.
January 14 – Industry Minister and Liberal leadership hopeful Brian Tobin announces that he is leaving politics.
January 15 – Jean Chrétien shuffles the cabinet mostly to remove the scandal-tainted Alfonso Gagliano.
January 18 – Walkerton Report released: it puts partial blame for the water tragedy on the provincial government.
January 25 – Canada officially re-establishes diplomatic relations with Afghanistan.
February 6 – Golden Jubilee of Elizabeth II's accession as Queen of Canada.
February 18 – The towns of Chicoutimi, Jonquière and La Baie consolidated into a new city officially called Saguenay.
March 4 – Federal government allows stem cell research using human embryos.
March 7 – James Bartleman appointed Lieutenant Governor of Ontario.
March 11 – Six children die when their home burns down in Quatsino, British Columbia.
March 20 – Stephen Harper defeats Stockwell Day to become leader of the Canadian Alliance.
March 23 – Ernie Eves is elected to replace Mike Harris as party leader at the Ontario Progressive Conservative leadership convention.
March 26 – Supreme Court of British Columbia rules that works of the imagination are not child pornography.

April to June
April 1 – The Canadian Air Transport Security Authority is established.
April 15 – Ernie Eves becomes premier of Ontario, replacing Mike Harris.
April 16 – The New York Sun, partially owned by former Canadian Conrad Black, is launched.
April 17 – Tarnak Farm incident. Four Canadian infantrymen are killed, and eight injured, in Afghanistan by friendly fire from two U.S. F-16s, dropping a 230-kilogram bomb.
May 5 – Hells Angels leader Maurice Boucher is convicted in Montreal of two counts of first-degree murder.
May 7 – A court injunction is granted to Marc Hall, permitting him to bring a same-sex date to his high school prom.
May 26 – Jean Chrétien shuffles the Cabinet again, removing Art Eggleton and Don Boudria, who were both embroiled in scandals.
June 2 – Governor General Adrienne Clarkson, on the advice of Prime Minister Jean Chrétien, dismisses Finance Minister Paul Martin and replaces him with John Manley.
June 5 – Alexa McDonough announces her resignation as leader of the federal New Democratic Party.
June 7 – Quebec becomes the first province to grant homosexual couples full parental rights.
June 26 – G8 leaders meet in Kananaskis, Alberta.

July to September
July 14 – During Bastille Day celebrations, Jacques Chirac is saved from an assassination attempt by a Canadian tourist.
July 23 – Pope John Paul II arrives in Toronto for World Youth Day.
August 6 – Joe Clark announces decision to resign as leader of the Progressive Conservative Party of Canada.
August 21 – Facing pressure from Martin loyalists Jean Chrétien announces he will step down as prime minister in February 2004.
September – A Senate special committee recommends that marijuana should be legalized in Canada.
September 9 – A riot breaks out at Concordia University in Montreal, by protesters against a scheduled talk by Israeli Prime Minister Ariel Sharon and Canadian Prime Minister Jean Chrétien; a Holocaust survivor and a rabbi are assaulted.

October to December
October 4 – The Queen arrives in Canada to start of 12-day tour to mark her Golden Jubilee as Queen of Canada.
October 7 – American officials deport Canadian citizen Maher Arar to Syria.
October 29 – Canada issues a travel advisory for all those of Middle Eastern descent travelling to the United States.
October 31 – Pat Buchanan calls Canada Soviet Canuckistan.
October 31 – In Sauvé v. Canada (Chief Electoral Officer), the Supreme Court rules that all prisoners have the right to vote under Section Three of the Charter of Rights and Freedoms, regardless of the stipulation in the Canada Elections Act that prisoners serving sentences of two years or more may not vote.
November 22 - The Sheppard Subway (Later renamed Line 4 Sheppard) opens on the Toronto Subway. 
November 26 – Françoise Ducros, the Prime Minister's communication director resigns over her comment that U.S. President George W. Bush is a "moron".
November 28 – The Royal Commission on the Future of Health Care in Canada (the Romanow Commission) recommends a $15-billion infusion into the health care system.
November 30 – Dennis Fentie becomes premier of Yukon Territory, replacing Pat Duncan.
December 16 – Canada signs the Kyoto Accord, limiting greenhouse gas emissions.
December 17 – The Service de police de la Ville de Québec arrest many people in a child prostitution bust that includes many well-known people of the city.

Arts and literature

Art
July 10 – At a Sotheby's auction, Peter Paul Rubens's painting "The Massacre of the Innocents" is sold for £49.5 million (US$76.2 million) to Canadian Kenneth Thomson.

New books
Family Matters: Rohinton Mistry
In Search of America: Peter Jennings
The Last Crossing: Guy Vanderhaeghe
Lucky Man: Michael J. Fox
Paris 1919: Six Months That Changed the World: Margaret MacMillan
Unless: Carol Shields
Negotiating with the Dead, A Writer on Writing: Margaret Atwood
Fences and Windows: Naomi Klein
School Spirit: Douglas Coupland
High Latitudes: An Arctic Journey: Farley Mowat

Awards
October 22 – Yann Martel wins the Booker Prize for his novel Life of Pi
November 5 – Austin Clarke wins the Giller Prize for his novel The Polished Hoe
Margaret MacMillan wins the Samuel Johnson Prize for Paris 1919: Six Months That Changed the World
Books in Canada First Novel Award: Mary Lawson, Crow Lake
See 2002 Governor General's Awards for a complete list of winners and finalists for those awards.
Geoffrey Bilson Award: Virginia Frances Schwartz, If I Just Had Two Wings
Gerald Lampert Award:
Griffin Poetry Prize: Christian Bök, Eunoia
Marian Engel Award: Terry Griggs
Matt Cohen Prize: Norman Levine
Norma Fleck Award: Gena K. Gorrell, Heart and Soul: The Story of Florence Nightingale
Pat Lowther Award:
Stephen Leacock Award: Will Ferguson, Generica
Timothy Findley Award: Bill Gaston
Trillium Book Award English: Austin Clarke, The Polished Hoe and Nino Ricci, Testament
Trillium Book Award French: Michel Ouellette, Le testament du couturier and Éric Charlebois, Faux-fuyants

Music
Joni Mitchell wins a Grammy for lifetime achievement

New music
A New Day Has Come: Céline Dion
Let Go: Avril Lavigne
Acoustic Kitty: John Mann
Under Rug Swept: Alanis Morissette
Vapor Trails: Rush
Does This Look Infected?: Sum 41
Up!: Shania Twain
What If It All Means Something: Chantal Kreviazuk

Film
Atom Egoyan's, Ararat is released.
April 12 – Atanarjuat: The Fast Runner, first movie in Inuktitut, the language of the Inuit.

Television
September 30 – CBC starts an uproar when it announces Ron MacLean will not be returning as host of Hockey Night in Canada. The CBC later agrees to MacLean's salary demands.
Sesame Park, a Canadian spin-off of the American show Sesame Street, is cancelled due to low ratings, after more than three decades of airing on CBC Television.
The CBC celebrates its 50th anniversary as a television broadcaster.

Sport
February 8 – February 242002 Winter Olympics in Salt Lake City, Utah. Canada wins gold for men's and women's hockey. Controversy erupts when Jamie Salé and David Pelletier are given only silver for the pairs' figure skating (later upgraded to gold after a judging controversy.
May 26The Kootenay Ice win their only Memorial Cup by defeating Victoriaville Tigres 6 to 3. The tournament was played at Guelph Sports and Entertainment Centre in Guelph, Ontario
November 23The Saint Mary's Huskies win their second (consecutive) Vanier Cup by defeating the Saskatchewan Huskies  33 to 21 in the 38th Vanier Cup played at Skydome in Toronto 
November 24The Montreal Alouettes win their fifth (and first since 1977) Grey Cup by defeating the Edmonton Eskimos 25 to 16 in the 90th Grey Cup played at Commonwealth Stadium in Edmonton

Births
 February 4 – Graham Verchere, actor
 May 10 – Sophia Ewaniuk, actress
 July 30 – Zachary Turner, murder victim (died 2003)
 September 6 – Leylah Fernandez, tennis player
 September 19 – Isaac Kragten, actor
 December 23 – Finn Wolfhard, actor

Deaths

January to March
January 4 – Douglas Jung, politician and first Chinese Canadian MP in the House of Commons of Canada (born 1924)
January 5 – Christie Harris, children's author (born 1907)
January 13 – Frank Shuster, comedian (born 1916)
January 24 – Peter Gzowski, broadcaster, writer and reporter (born 1933)
February 3 – Lucien Rivard, criminal and prison escapee (born 1914)
February 14 – Bud Olson, politician, Minister and Senator (born 1925)
February 26 – Harry Rankin, lawyer and politician (born 1920)
March 12 – Jean-Paul Riopelle, painter and sculptor (born 1923)
March 18
Dalton Camp, journalist, politician, political strategist and commentator (born 1920)
Johnny Lombardi, CHIN-TV television personality (born 1915)

April to June
April 14 – Gustave Blouin, politician (born 1912)
April 17 – Richard Green, soldier killed in Afghanistan (born 1980)
April 19 – Ross Whicher, politician and businessman (born 1918)
May 9 – Robert Layton, politician (born 1925)
May 17 – Edwin Alonzo Boyd, criminal and leader of the Boyd Gang (born 1914)
June 21 – Timothy Findley, novelist and playwright (born 1930)

July to December
July 8 – Sidney Spivak, politician and Minister (born 1928)
July 13 – Yousuf Karsh, photographer (born 1908)
September 13 – George Stanley, historian, author, soldier, teacher, public servant and designer of the current Canadian flag (born 1907)
November 24 – Harry Gunning, scientist and administrator (born 1916)
November 30 – Jeffrey Baldwin, murder victim (born 1997)

December 5 – Prosper Boulanger, politician and businessman (born 1918)
December 10 – Les Costello, ice hockey player and Catholic priest (born 1928)
December 13 – Zal Yanovsky, rock musician (born 1944)
December 16 – Bill Hunter, ice hockey player, general manager and coach (born 1920)
December 18 – Ray Hnatyshyn, politician and 24th Governor General of Canada (born 1934)

See also
 2002 in Canadian television
 List of Canadian films of 2002

References 

 
Years of the 21st century in Canada
2000s in Canada
Canada
Canada